Seimsdalen is a valley in Årdal Municipality in Vestland county, Norway. The population of the valley is 467 (2013).

References

Villages in Vestland
Valleys of Vestland
Årdal